Claremontia is a genus of insects belonging to the family Tenthredinidae.

The genus was first described by Rohwer in 1909.

The species of this genus are found in Europe.

Species:
 Claremontia alternipes
 Claremontia brevicornis
 Claremontia hispanica
 Claremontia tenuicornis
 Claremontia uncta
 Claremontia waldheimii

References

Tenthredinidae
Sawfly genera